John Kenyon may refer to:

John Robert Kenyon (1807–1880), British lawyer and academic
John Samuel Kenyon (1874–1959), American linguist
John Snyders Kenyon (1843-1902), American politician and Medal of Honor recipient
John Philipps Kenyon (1927–1996), English historian
John Kenyon (patron) (1784–1856), English literary patron and philanthropist
John Kenyon (priest) (1812–1869), Irish Catholic priest and nationalist
John Kenyon (footballer) (1953–), English football player